Phyllis Joan Ruble Pond (October 25, 1930 – September 22, 2013) was  an American educator and politician.

Born in Warren, Indiana, Pond grew up on a farm near there and graduated from Warren High School; she then received her degrees in education from Ball State University and Indiana State University. Pond then taught school in different places and then in New Haven, Indiana, where she lived. Pond served in the Indiana House of Representatives as a Republican from 1978 until her death in 2013. Pond died in New Haven, Indiana just before her retirement from the Indiana House of Representatives took effect.

Notes

1930 births
2013 deaths
People from Huntington County, Indiana
People from New Haven, Indiana
Ball State University alumni
Indiana State University alumni
Women state legislators in Indiana
Republican Party members of the Indiana House of Representatives
21st-century American women